Trussardi is a surname. Notable people with the surname include:

Beatrice Trussardi (born 1971), Italian businesswoman
Luigi Trussardi (1938–2010), French jazz bassist
Nicola Trussardi (1942–1999), Italian fashion designer and entrepreneur

Italian-language surnames